Julia Mann (born 9 August 1971) is a female retired British badminton player.

Badminton career
Mann won the English National Badminton Championships eight times. She holds a record for winning National title seven years consecutively from 1997 to 2003, the highest number of wins in Women's category since the championship began in 1964.

She represented England and won a gold medal in the women's team event and a bronze medal in the singles, at the 1998 Commonwealth Games in Kuala Lumpur, Malaysia. Four year later she competed in the singles during the 2002 Commonwealth Games in Manchester. Mann also reached the quarter finals of the 2001 All England Open Badminton Championships.

References

External links
 

1971 births
Living people
English female badminton players
Commonwealth Games medallists in badminton
Commonwealth Games gold medallists for England
Commonwealth Games bronze medallists for England
Badminton players at the 2002 Commonwealth Games
Badminton players at the 1998 Commonwealth Games
Olympic badminton players of Great Britain
Badminton players at the 2000 Summer Olympics
Medallists at the 1998 Commonwealth Games